Dylan James Joseph Switters (born 14 February 2001) is an English footballer who plays as a midfielder.

A product of the Norwich City and Stevenage academies, Switters made his first-team debut for Stevenage in April 2018. He made two appearances during his time at his hometown club and spent time on loan at non-League teams Great Yarmouth Town and Kings Langley respectively. Switters signed for Hayes & Yeading United in August 2019 and played there for four months. A brief spell at Götene IF followed, before he spent two seasons at Southern League Central club Leiston.

Career

Stevenage
Switters began his career at Norwich City where he was a regular for the club's under-18 team. He subsequently signed a one-and-a-half year academy scholarship with Stevenage in December 2017 and played regularly in the under-18 team's run to the Fourth Round in the FA Youth Cup that season. He made his professional debut for Stevenage in the club's 3–1 League Two victory over Exeter City at Broadhall Way on 28 April 2018, coming on as a 90th-minute substitute in the match.

Having made no first-team appearances for Stevenage during the first half of the 2018–19 season, Switters joined Eastern Counties League Premier Division club Great Yarmouth Town in December 2018, on a one-month work-experience loan agreement. He made his debut for Great Yarmouth in the club's 2–1 victory over Haverhill Rovers on 22 December 2018. Switters scored his first goal for the club four days later, on 26 December 2018, in a 2–0 home victory against local rivals Gorleston. He was also awarded Man of the Match for his performance. He scored three times in five appearances during the loan spell. Following the conclusion of his loan spell at Great Yarmouth, Switters joined Southern League Premier Division South club Kings Langley in January 2019. He made his debut as a second-half substitute in a 2–0 home win against Basingstoke Town on 29 January 2019. Switters made seven appearances during his time at Kings Langley, scoring once during his time there, in a 3–0 victory over Beaconsfield Town.

Hayes & Yeading United
Switters spent the early part of pre-season ahead of the 2019–20 season on trial at Wealdstone of the National League South, playing in a friendly against Hayes & Yeading United. He subsequently joined Hayes & Yeading on trial before signing for the club on a permanent basis ahead of the start of the Southern League season. He made his Hayes & Yeading debut in a 2–2 draw away at Tiverton Town on 10 August 2019, coming on as a 61st-minute in the match. Switters played 16 times for the club in all competitions, scoring twice. He left Hayes & Yeading in December 2019.

Leiston
Without a club, Switters enrolled in a player placement programme set up by the League Football Education, which is a three-month placement that enables ex-apprentices to experience European training facilities and techniques with a club in Europe. He joined Götene IF of the Swedish Västergötland Norra, although his placement there was curtailed due to the COVID-19 pandemic in March 2020. Ahead of the start of the 2020–21 season, Switters trialled with Hendon, but ultimately no transfer materialised. He signed for Leiston of the Southern League Premier Division Central on 10 September 2020. Switters made his debut in a 5–0 victory over Halstead Town in the FA Cup two days after signing and scored his first goal in the club's 2–2 draw with AFC Rushden & Diamonds on 6 October 2020. He made 14 appearances in the opening two months of the season, scoring once, as Leiston's season was curtailed due to restrictions associated with the COVID-19 pandemic.

Switters remained at Leiston for the start of the 2021–22 season, playing 20 times during the first half of the season. He joined Southern League Central club St Neots Town on loan in January 2022, making three appearances before a recurring foot injury ended his season early. Switters underwent surgery on his foot in April 2022. He left Leiston at the end of that season. Switters trialled with FC United of Manchester in July 2022, although no transfer materialised.

Personal life
Switters changed his surname by deed poll in July 2018. He was previously known as Dylan O'Donnell.

Career statistics

References

External links

2001 births
Living people
English footballers
Association football defenders
Stevenage F.C. players
Great Yarmouth Town F.C. players
Kings Langley F.C. players
Hayes & Yeading United F.C. players
Leiston F.C. players
St Neots Town F.C. players
English Football League players